All the Best is a compilation album by Australian country music artist John Williamson. The album was released in July 1986 and peaked at number 27 on the Kent Music Report. The album includes Williamson's debut single "Old Man Emu" from 1970 and includes one new track "Goodbye Blinky Bill".

Track listing

Charts

Release history

References

1986 greatest hits albums
John Williamson (singer) compilation albums
Festival Records compilation albums